Mark Covell (born 7 November 1968) is a Scottish competitive sailor and Olympic medalist. He won a silver medal in the Star class at the 2000 Summer Olympics in Sydney, along with Ian Walker.

He sailed with Team Russia as their media crew member for the 2008–09 Volvo Ocean Race.

References

External links 
 
 
 

1967 births
Living people
Scottish male sailors (sport)
Sailors at the 2000 Summer Olympics – Star
Olympic sailors of Great Britain
Scottish Olympic medallists
Olympic silver medallists for Great Britain
Olympic medalists in sailing
Volvo Ocean Race sailors
Etchells class sailors
Etchells class world champions
5.5 Metre class sailors
World Champions in 5.5 Metre
World champions in sailing for Great Britain
Medalists at the 2000 Summer Olympics